Astrophytum caput-medusae (synonym Digitostigma caput-medusae)  is a species of cactus native to Mexico, specifically the state of Nuevo León; the plant is reported to grow wild only at a single location. This species differs from the conventional star-shaped phenotype associated with other Astrophytum members. The plant is characterized by a cylindrical, reduced stem with triangular or cylindrical tubercles producing yellow flowers with orange perianth sections. Propagation by seed, tissue culture or via grafting have all been reported. The species is considered critically endangered by the IUCN due to the plant's limited growth range, destruction by livestock and over collection of wild specimen by plant collectors

References

External links

caputmedusae
Plants described in 2003